This is a survey of the postage stamps and postal history of Nauru.

The Republic of Nauru is an island country in Micronesia in the South Pacific. Its nearest neighbour is Banaba Island in Kiribati,  to the east.

Pre-independence

As part of German Marshall Islands Protectorate, the first post office on the island opened in 1905 using stamps of German Marshall Islands. Following the outbreak of World War I, Nauru was occupied by Australian forces and Australian stamps overprinted North West Pacific Islands were used from 1914 to 1916. The British government then took control of the island and British stamps overprinted NAURU were issued in October 1916.  From 1924, stamps were issued for Nauru as a mandated territory, then as a trust territory after WWII.

Independence
The first stamps of independent Nauru were issued in 1968.

See also
Postage stamps and postal history of the Marshall Islands

References

External links
The G.B. Overprint Society: Nauru

Communications in Nauru
Nauru